Jacques Jean-Pierre Neveu (14 November 193217 May 2016) was a Belgian (and then French) mathematician, specializing in probability theory. He is one of the founders of the French school (post WW II) of probability and statistics.

Education and career

Jacques Neveu received in 1955 from the Sorbonne his doctorate in mathematics under Robert Fortet with dissertation Étude des semi-groupes de Markov.

In 1960, Neveu was, with Robert Fortet, one of the first two members of the Laboratoire de Probabilités et Modèles Aléatoires (LPMA). He was the LPMA's director from 1980 until 1989 when Jean Jacod became the director.

In 1962, Neveu was a chargé de cours (university lecturer) at the Collège de France. He was a professor at the École Polytechnique. In 1976, he gave a course at l'école d'été de Saint-Flour (a summer school in probability theory sponsored by the University of Clermont Auvergne). He was a visiting professor in Brussels, São Paulo, and Leuven.

From 1969 to 1987, Neveu was the thesis advisor for 19 doctoral students. In 1977 he was the president of the Société mathématique de France. In 1991, he founded the group Modélisation Aléatoire et Statistique (MAS) of the Société de Mathématiques Appliquées et Industrielles (SMAI). In 2012 he was elected a Fellow of the American Mathematical Society.

Research
Neveu is one of the founders of the modern theory of probability. His research deals with Markov processes, Markov chains, Gaussian processes, martingales, ergodic theory, random trees (especially Galton-Watson processes and Galton-Watson trees), and Dirac measures, as well as applications of probability theory to statistics, computer science, combinatorics, and statistical physics.

Commemoration
Several mathematicians have paid tribute to Neveu for his influence on the modern theory of probability.

He was outstanding in teaching as well as research. In honor of Neveu, a prize is awarded by the MAS group of the SMAI to the year's best of the new French holders of doctorates in mathematicians or statistics on the basis of the judged quality of the dissertation.

Prix Jacques Neveu
The laureates are:
2008: Pierre Nolin;
2009: Amandine Véber;
2010: Sébastien Bubeck & Kilian Raschel;
2011: Nicolas Curien;
2012: Pierre Jacob et Quentin Berger;
2013: Adrien Kassel;
2014: Emilie Kaufmann & Julien Reygner;
2015: Erwin Scornet;
2016: Anna Ben-Hamou;
2017: Aran Raoufi;
2018: Elsa Cazelles.

Selected publications

Articles
"Lattice methods and submarkovian processes." In Fourth Berkeley Symposium on Mathematical Statistics and Probability, pp. 347–391. 1961.
"Existence of bounded invariant measures in ergodic theory." In Proc. Fifth Berkeley Sympos. Math. Statist. and Probability (Berkeley, Calif., 1965/66), vol. 2, no. Part 2, pp. 461–472. 1967.
"Temps d'arrêt d'un système dynamique." Zeitschrift für Wahrscheinlichkeitstheorie und Verwandte Gebiete, vol. 13, no. 2, 1969, pp. 81–94. 
"Potentiel Markovien récurrent des chaînes de Harris." Ann. Inst. Fourier, vol. 22, no. 2, 1972, pp. 85–130.
"Sur l’espérance conditionelle par rapport à un mouvement brownien." Ann. Inst. H. Poincaré, section B, vol. 12, no. 2, 1976, pp. 105–109.
"Processus ponctuels." In École d’Eté de Probabilités de Saint-Flour VI-1976, pp. 249–445. Springer, Berlin, Heidelberg, 1977. 
Arbres et processus de Galton-Watson, Annales de l'IHP, section B, vol. 22, 1986, pp. 199–207.
"Multiplicative martingales for spatial branching processes." In Seminar on Stochastic Processes, 1987, pp. 223–242. Birkhäuser Boston, 1988. 
with Francis Comets: The Sherrington-Kirkpatrick model of spin glasses and stochastic calculus: the high temperature case. Communications in Mathematical Physics, vol. 166, no. 3, 1995, pp. 549–564.

Books
Théorie des semi-groups de Markov, University of California Press 1958 (and Gauthier-Villars 1958)
Bases mathématiques du calcul des probabilités, Masson, 1964, 1970
English translation: Mathematical foundations of the calculus of probability, Holden-Day 1965
Processus aléatoires gaulliens, Montréal: Presses de l'Université de Montréal, 1968
Cours de probabilités, École Polytechnique, 1970, 1978
Martingales à temps discret, Masson, 1972
English translation: Discrete-parameter martingales, Elsevier, 1975
Théorie de la mesure et intégration, cours de l'École polytechnique, 1983
Introduction aux processus aléatoires,  École Polytechnique 1985

References

Belgian mathematicians
French mathematicians
Probability theorists
University of Paris alumni
Academic staff of the University of Paris
Fellows of the American Mathematical Society
1932 births
2016 deaths